László Szomjas (31 May 1904 – 31 May 1991) was a Hungarian sports shooter. He competed in three events at the 1924 Summer Olympics.

References

External links
 

1904 births
1991 deaths
Hungarian male sport shooters
Olympic shooters of Hungary
Shooters at the 1924 Summer Olympics
Place of birth missing